Solontsi (Ukrainian: Солонці) is a village situated in the Kherson Raion in the Kherson Oblast of Ukraine.

As of 2022, the village is under the occupation of Russian forces as a result of the 2022 Russian invasion of Ukraine.

Population 
The distribution of population by their native language based on the 2001 Ukrainian census:

It had a pre-war population of 1,050 inhabitants.

References 

Villages in Kherson Raion